Jimmy Joyce (27 May 1907 – 8 October 1980) was  a former Australian rules footballer who played with Footscray in the Victorian Football League (VFL).

Notes

External links 
		

1907 births
1980 deaths
Australian rules footballers from Victoria (Australia)
Western Bulldogs players